Peer may refer to:

Sociology
 Peer, an equal in age, education or social class; see Peer group
 Peer, a member of the peerage; related to the term "peer of the realm"

Computing
 Peer, one of several functional units in the same layer of a network; See Peer group (computer networking)
 Peer (networking), a computer system connected to others on a network
 Peer, a computer network in a voluntary interconnection of administratively separate Internet networks in peering

Organizations
 Partnership for European Environmental Research, a network of seven European environmental research centres
 Public Employees for Environmental Responsibility, an organization of anonymous public employees promoting environmental responsibility

People

Given name
 Peer Åström (born 1972), Swedish composer, lyricist, musician and record producer
 Peer Guldbrandsen (1912–1996), Danish screenwriter, actor, film director and producer
 Peer Hultberg (1935–2007), Danish author and psychoanalyst
 Peer Joechel (born 1967), German bobsledder
 Peer Lisdorf (born 1967), Danish footballer and coach 
 Peer Lorenzen (born 1944), Danish jurist and judge and section president of the European Court of Human Rights
 Peer Mascini (1941–2019), Dutch actor
 Peer Moberg (born 1971), Norwegian sport sailor
 Peer Nielsen (born 1942), Danish sprint canoer 
 Peer Qvam (1911–1977), Norwegian architect
 Peer Raben (1940–2007), German composer born Wilhelm Rabenbauer
 Peer Smed (1878–1943), Danish-American silversmith and metalworker
 Peer Stromme (1856–1921), American pastor, teacher, journalist and author

Surname
 Elizabeth Peer (1936–1984), American pioneering woman journalist
 Ralph Peer (1892–1960), American talent scout, recording engineer, record producer and music publisher

Other uses
 Peer, the title character of Peer Gynt, a play by Henrik Ibsen, or Peer Günt Finnish rock band
 Peer, Belgium, a municipality
 Twelve Peers, in legend, the twelve foremost knights of Charlemagne's court

See also
 Pe'er, a list of people with the given name or surname
 Peers (disambiguation), a surname and place name
 Pir (Sufism)  (also spelled Peer)
 Pier (disambiguation)
 Pir (disambiguation)
 
 

Masculine given names
Surnames from given names
Danish masculine given names